Frank Daroma (born 12 April 2001) is a Sierra Leonean footballer who currently plays for MLS Next Pro side Tacoma Defiance.

Career

Youth 
Daroma played with the USSDA Barca Residency academy for a year prior to attending college.

College 
In early 2019, Daroma signed a letter of intent to play college soccer at the University of California, Santa Barbara. However, Daroma went on to attend California State University, San Bernardino later that year, where he went on to make 19 appearances, scoring 4 goals and tallying 5 assists for the 'Yotes. In his freshman season, Daroma was named CCAA Freshman of the Year and was  honored as a First Team All-American and All Region selection. There was no 2020 season in the CCAA due to the COVID-19 pandemic.

Professional
On 5 April 2021, Daroma was announced as a signing for USL Championship side Las Vegas Lights, opting to pursue a professional career and leaving college early. Daroma made his professional debut on 5 May 2021, starting in a 5–0 loss to LA Galaxy II.

References

External links
CSUSB bio

2001 births
Association football midfielders
Cal State San Bernardino Coyotes men's soccer players
Expatriate soccer players in the United States
Las Vegas Lights FC players
Living people
People from Goleta, California
Sierra Leonean expatriate footballers
Sierra Leonean expatriate sportspeople in the United States
Sierra Leonean footballers
Soccer players from California
USL Championship players
Sportspeople from San Bernardino County, California